Facelina rhodopos is a species of sea slug, an aeolid nudibranch, a marine gastropod mollusc in the family Facelinidae.

Distribution
Originally described from the Red Sea. This species has been reported from Reunion Island, the Philippines, Marshall Islands, Malaysia and Japan.

References

Facelinidae
Gastropods described in 2000